Belinda Peregrín is a Spanish-born Mexican singer-songwriter, actress, record producer and dancer.
Latin Music Italian Awards 2013

BMI Latin Music Awards

Billboard Latin Music Awards

Eres Awards

Eres Niños Awards

Latin Grammy Awards

Latin Music and Sports Awards

La Gente Awards

Los Premios MTV Latinoamérica

Lo Nuestro Awards

Mi TRL Awards

Monitor Latino Awards

Nickelodeon - Kids Choice Awards México

Orgullosamente Latino Awards

Oye Awards

Palmas de Oro (Mexico)

Pantalla de Cristal Awards

People en Español Awards

Premios Juventud

Quiero Awards

Shock Awards

Telehit Awards

Top Glamour Awards

Tu Musica Awards (Puerto Rico)

TVyNovelas Awards

Terra Awards

Texas Awards

40 Principales Awards

References 

Peregrin, Belinda
Awards